The FN Tricar was a military motorcycle manufactured before WW2 by FN Herstal of Belgium. As of 2014, around only 7 exist and owned by private collectors.

Users

References
 Issue 20 Véhicules Militaires International, C. Gillet 
 https://web.archive.org/web/20160413131432/http://www.appeldephare.com/motos/mmb1.html
 http://motos-of-war.ru/en/motorcycles/fn-tricar/

See also
FN (motorcycle)

Military motorcycles
Herstal
Military vehicles of Belgium
Three-wheeled motor vehicles